"Let the Bad Times Roll" is a song by American punk rock band the Offspring. It is the title track from their tenth studio album of the same name and was released as the album's second single on February 23, 2021. The single topped the Billboard Mainstream Rock chart, making it the band's third song to do so following "Gone Away" (1997) and "Coming for You" (2015). It also reached the top 10 on Alternative Airplay and peaked at No. 29 on the Hot Rock Songs chart. On the album, the song is reprised as a modified version on the closing track "Lullaby".

Background 
Originally written in 2019, the song was recorded in 2020 for the band's tenth studio album of the same name. According to lead vocalist Dexter Holland, the song's lyrics recount the ongoing socio-political obstacles of the time when it was written. "I feel like we're in a unique period in history where instead of our world leaders saying 'we're doing our best,'" Holland said. "It's more like they're saying 'fuck it,' and it's really scary." In particular, the song enjoys poking fun at Donald Trump, with lyrics such as "gonna build a wall" and "Hey Lincoln, how does your grave roll?", referencing the common idiom of a deceased person rolling in his/her grave.

Music video 
The music video for "Let the Bad Times Roll" premiered on March 25, 2021, a month after the song was released as a single. It shows an exaggerated view of life during the COVID-19 quarantine, with the video's characters experiencing bizarre and frightening situations while stuck at home. As of September 2021, it has gained over 4.6 million views.

Critical reception 
In a positive review, Ash Anders of Spinnaker called the song's chorus "catchy and fun" and noted that the song had "a very distinct sound" compared to the rest of the album. Tim Hoffman of Riff Magazine praised the song, describing it as having "a pop-rock aesthetic with a more upbeat and bouncy melody to contrast the cynical lyrics".

Charts

Weekly charts

Year-end charts

Personnel 
 Dexter Holland – lead and backing vocals, rhythm guitar, bass guitar
 Noodles – lead guitar, backing vocals
 Josh Freese – drums
 Jason "Blackball" McLean – additional vocals

References 

The Offspring songs
2021 songs
2021 singles
Music videos directed by Marc Klasfeld
Song recordings produced by Bob Rock
Songs written by Dexter Holland
Songs about Donald Trump
American pop rock songs